Szabolcs Barna (born 27 April 1996) is a Hungarian footballer.

Club statistics

Updated to games played as of 15 May 2021.

References

External links

1996 births
Living people
Sportspeople from Debrecen
Hungarian footballers
Association football defenders
Debreceni VSC players
Báránd KSE footballers
Nyíregyháza Spartacus FC players
MTK Budapest FC players
Győri ETO FC players
Nemzeti Bajnokság I players
Nemzeti Bajnokság II players